Alpine is a hamlet in Schuyler County, New York, United States. Alpine has a post office with ZIP code 14805, which opened on April 15, 1852.

References

Hamlets in Schuyler County, New York
Hamlets in New York (state)